Metallurg (with spelling variations) is the name of several ex-Soviet sport clubs:

 Metallurg Bratsk, a Russian bandy club
 Metallurg Magnitogorsk, a Russian ice hockey club
 Metallurg Novokuznetsk, another Russian hockey club
 FC Metallurg Lipetsk, a Russian football club
 FC Metallurg-Kuzbass Novokuznetsk, a Russian football club
 FK Metalurg Skopje, a football club from Macedonia
 Metallurg Kadamjay, a Kyrgyzstani football club
 FC Metalurh Donetsk, a Ukrainian football club
 FC Metalurh Zaporizhzhya, a Ukrainian football club
 PFK Metallurg Bekabad, a Uzbekistani football club